The British Rail Class 155 is a diesel multiple unit passenger train. These DMUs were built by Leyland Bus at Workington (incorporating some Leyland National bus components) between 1987 and 1988 as part of BR's replacement of its ageing first-generation diesel fleet. 42 units were originally built, of which only 7 remain; the other 35 units were converted to  railcars.

Background
By the beginning of the 1980s, British Rail (BR) operated a large fleet of  first generation DMUs, which had been constructed in prior decades to various designs. While formulating its long-term strategy for this sector of its operations, British Rail planners recognised that there would be considerable costs incurred by undertaking refurbishment programmes necessary for the continued use of these aging multiple units. Planners instead examined the prospects for the development and introduction of a new generation of DMUs to succeed the first generation.

The initial specification was relatively ambitious, calling for a maximum speed of 90 mph (145 km/h), acceleration comparable to contemporary EMUs. This specification led to the experimental British Rail Class 210 DMU. However, it was found to be expensive, and it was recognised that a production model assembled from proven components would possess greater reliability and lower maintenance costs; an availability rate of 85 percent was forecast.

By 1983, experiences with the Class 210 had influenced BR planners to favour procuring a new generation of DMUs, but to also adopt a new specification that were somewhat less demanding than before. Specifically, it was decided to drop the top speed from 90 mph to 75 mph, as testing had revealed the higher rate to deliver no perceivable improvement in journey times due to the typically short spacing of the stations the type was intended to serve. The requests for compatibility with other rolling stock were eliminated, although auto-coupling and auto-connecting functionality was added. In addition to a good ride quality, the specification included a sound level of 90 dB when at full speed, an operational range of 1,000 miles, and an interval between major overhauls of five years or 350,000 miles.

The bid submitted by British Rail Engineering Limited (BREL) was heavily based on its successful Class 455 EMU, sharing its body and the majority of its running gear, albeit equipped with two different power trains.

The resulting Class 150 was viewed as unsatisfactory for more-upmarket services. Studies showed coaches could be stretched, providing more internal volume and thus enabling the somewhat cramped two-by-three seating arrangement of the Class 150 to be substituted with a more roomy two-by-two counterpart. These changes could be implemented without impacting much of the benefits of adopting the existing design.

It was identified that this would result in a weight increase and thus a decreased power-to-weight ratio, but it was determined that the performance of the proposed DMU was only slightly lower, and it could achieve similar journey times across the intended cross-country routes as the Class 150. It was also found that, while there was a slight increase in fuel consumption due to the changes, the envisioned DMU had lower fuel consumption than locomotive-hauled trains and lower maintenance costs. Accordingly, it was decided to proceed with developing a detailed specification and issuing it to industry. Amongst the requirements listed in the issued specification was the explicit statement of the acceptability of the proven power trains of both the Class 150 and Class 151.

Description 

The fleet was part of the "Super Sprinter" build, the other part of which was the Class 156 fleet - though only the latter carried the "Super Sprinter" branding. They were manufactured by British Leyland, who used similar construction techniques to those used on the more basic Pacer railbuses. The relatively lightweight body, which was mounted on a welded floor assembly, comprised a series of pre-formed panels that were fixed together via the extensive use of Avdel rivets. The body is lined with a somewhat large number of windows, which is said to make the coaches appear unusually long; despite considerations towards adopting sealed windows to reduce noise levels, the windows are openable for natural ventilation. It has been observed that, as a byproduct of the vehicle's lightweight construction and length, certain coaches have exhibited a slight, but visible, sag.

Operations
The Class 155 was introduced to service at a rapid rate, despite the presence of some teething issues with the type. The units were the first BR DMUs to be furnished with sliding-plug automatic doors which closed to provide a smooth bodyside rather than sliding back into the bodyshell (the system used with 150s and 151s). During their early service, it was found that these doors often failed to work properly; there were reports of the doors opening while the trains were in motion. Consequently, the fleet was temporarily taken out of use and modified, while the 156s were assigned to perform their diagrams as an interim measure.

Following this modification work, the performance of the Class 155 improved substantially. An emerging requirement for replacement rural lines stock ultimately led to the decision to convert the majority of the Regional Railways' Class 155 fleet into a single car configuration, enabling these units to replace the elderly 121 and 122 "Bubblecar" units. Originally, it had been intended for these single-car units, which had been introduced roughly 30 years prior, to be withdrawn and entirely replaced by the incoming Pacer fleet; however, experience with the Pacers determined that they were unable to work the sharply-curving steeply-graded branchlines involved. Instead, the Pacers were moved to replace a number of Class 150s, the 150s took over certain 156 diagrams, and the 156s took on the 155 services which were not handed over to the new Class 158s. The 155s emerged from the workshops as single car Class 153s, and were put to work augmenting two car units and on the quiet Cornish, Welsh, North-Western, Norfolk and Lincolnshire branch lines. They did not operate North of the Scottish border before 2020. However, West Yorkshire Passenger Transport Executive refused to allow the seven units which they owned to be converted, and these were merely modified to operate reliably in original form. The conversion to single car units was notable for not requiring any external doors to be moved, although this has led to the No.2 cab being unusually cramped, despite being extended into the vestibule area.

The previously mentioned seven remaining Class 155 units, which are numbered 155341 to 155347, were constructed in 1988 for West Yorkshire Passenger Transport Executive (WYPTE) for their MetroTrain services, and have continued to serve in their original formation across multiple decades. The type is currently operated solely by Northern Trains. They were previously frequently seen on Manchester Victoria to Leeds services but, as of 2019, the Class 155s are allocated to Hull and mostly operate routes in Yorkshire.

Fleet details

Model railways 
In 2000, Hornby Railways launched its first version of the Class 155 in OO gauge.

References

Notes

Citations

Sources

External links 

  Train Testing site - pictures of class 155 testing and early service running

155
British Leyland vehicles
Train-related introductions in 1987